Hoplestigma is a genus of flowering plants in the family Boraginaceae, although this is disputed, and it has been placed in its own family Hoplestigmataceae. Its two species are native to Cameroon, Gabon, Ivory Coast and Liberia in western tropical Africa.

Taxonomy
The genus Hoplestigma was established by Jean Baptiste Louis Pierre in 1899. The genus name Hoplestigma is derived from the Greek , "a hoof or a cloven hoof" and stigma, "a flower stigma". The botanical name is a reference to the deeply bifid style.

The family placement of the genus has varied. It was traditionally included in Boraginaceae sensu lato, as it was in the APG IV system, and by Plants of the World Online . A study of pollen in 1989 suggested that Hoplestigma might be related to the family Ehretiaceae (= Boraginaceae subfamily Ehretioideae). In a 2014 molecular phylogenetic study based on chloroplast DNA, Hoplestigma formed a strongly supported clade with Coldenia and genera that have been placed in the family Cordiaceae (= Boraginaceae subfamily Cordioideae) and the authors recommended that Hoplestigma and Coldenia be included in Cordiaceae. In 2016, the Boraginales Working Group placed Hoplestigma in its own family Hoplestigmataceae.

Species
, two species are recognized:
 Hoplestigma klaineanum Pierre
 Hoplestigma pierreanum Gilg
Both are rare trees of lowland jungle in West and Central Africa.

References

External links 
 Cordiaceae  Boraginales  trees  Angiosperm Phylogeny Website  Missouri Botanical Garden Website
 CRC World Dictionary of Plant Names: D-L  Botany & Plant Science  Life Science  CRC Press

 
Boraginaceae
Taxonomy articles created by Polbot